Nest is an Icelandic short film from 2022, directed and written by Hlynur Pálmason. The story follows siblings building a tree house together over the course of a year. It was filmed by Hlynur right outside his house over a period of 18 months, with the support and assistance of his three children.

It won a number of film festival awards that year. At the Odense International Film Festival, Nest won Best Danish Short Film, and was nominated as Short Film Candidate for the 35th European Film Awards.Nest was nominated for the Zabaltegi-Tabakalera Prize at the San Sebastián International Film Festival, which was won by another of Hlynur's films, Godland. Nest also won the Grande Prémio Competição Internacional
at the Vila do Conde International Short Film Festival.

Far Out magazine chose Nest as the best short film of 2022.

Nest was released on the streaming service MUBI as part of their Best of 2022 series.

References

External links 
 Nest at the Icelandic Film Centre
 

2022 films
Icelandic drama films
Icelandic short films